The Lawrence Public Schools Union Free School District 15 is a comprehensive community public school district, serving students in pre-kindergarten through twelfth grade, located in the southwest section of Nassau County, New York, and borders the New York City borough of Queens.

Communities in the district include Lawrence, Cedarhurst, Inwood, and Atlantic Beach, and sections of North Woodmere and Woodmere.

Schools 
The district consists of the following schools:

Preschool 
Lawrence Early Childhood Center at #4 School

Elementary schools 
Lawrence Number 2 School (grades 1–3)
Lawrence Elementary at The Broadway Campus (grades 4-6)

Middle school 
Lawrence Middle School at The Broadway Campus (grades 7-8)

High school 
Lawrence High School (grades 9-12)

Demographics
On December 3, 2006, Newsday reported that of 3,692 students, 52.9% were white, 16.1% were black, 25.5% were Hispanic and 5.6% were "other."

Board of Trustees

 Murray Forman – Board of Education president
 Asher Mansdorf – Board of Education vice president
 David Sussman – Board of Education trustee
 Heshy Blachorsky – Board of Education trustee
 Abel Feldhamer – Board of Education trustee
 Michael Hatten – Board of Education trustee
 Mrs. Tova Plaut – Board of Education trustee

Notable alumni
 Lyle Alzado (1949–1992), NFL defensive tackle for Oakland Raiders and Denver Broncos
 Mickey Hart (born 1943), Grateful Dead percussionist
 Alan Kalter, announcer/on-camera personality, Late Show with David Letterman
 Aline Kominsky-Crumb, comics artist
 Peggy Lipton (born 1946), actress
 Steve Madden (born 1958), shoe designer
 Ira Magaziner (born 1947, class of 1965), aide to President Bill Clinton
 Shane Olivea (born 1981), NFL offensive tackle for San Diego Chargers
 Evan Roberts (born 1983), sports radio personality who co-hosts the Joe & Evan show
 Michael Scarola, stage director for the New York City Opera, Lincoln Center

References

External links
Lawrence Public Schools

Education in Nassau County, New York
School districts in New York (state)
School districts established in 1891